Extended X-ray absorption fine structure (EXAFS), along with X-ray absorption near edge structure (XANES), is a subset of X-ray absorption spectroscopy (XAS). Like other absorption spectroscopies, XAS techniques follow Beer's law. The X-ray absorption coefficient of a material as a function of energy is obtained using X-rays of a narrow energy resolution are directed at a sample and the incident and transmitted x-ray intensity is recorded as the incident x-ray energy is incremented. 

When the incident x-ray energy matches the binding energy of an electron of an atom within the sample, the number of x-rays absorbed by the sample increases dramatically, causing a drop in the transmitted x-ray intensity. This results in an absorption edge. Every element has a set of unique absorption edges corresponding to different binding energies of its electrons, giving XAS element selectivity. XAS spectra are most often collected at synchrotrons because of the high intensity of synchrotron X-ray sources allow the concentration of the absorbing element to reach as low as a few parts per million. Absorption would be undetectable if the source is too weak. Because X-rays are highly penetrating, XAS samples can be gases, solids or liquids.

Background

EXAFS spectra are displayed as plots of the absorption coefficient of a given material versus energy, typically in a 500 – 1000 eV range beginning before an absorption edge of an element in the sample. The x-ray absorption coefficient is usually normalized to unit step height. This is done by regressing a line to the region before and after the absorption edge, subtracting the pre-edge line from the entire data set and dividing by the absorption step height, which is determined by the difference between the pre-edge and post-edge lines at the value of E0 (on the absorption edge).

The normalized absorption spectra are often called XANES spectra. These spectra can be used to determine the average oxidation state of the element in the sample. The XANES spectra are also sensitive to the coordination environment of the absorbing atom in the sample.  Finger printing methods have been used to match the XANES spectra of an unknown sample to those of known "standards". Linear combination fitting of several different standard spectra can give an estimate to the amount of each of the known standard spectra within an unknown sample.

X-ray absorption spectra are produced over the range of 200 – 35,000 eV. The dominant physical process is one where the absorbed photon ejects a core photoelectron from the absorbing atom, leaving behind a core hole. The atom with the core hole is now excited.  The ejected photoelectron's energy will be equal to that of the absorbed photon minus the binding energy of the initial core state. The ejected photoelectron interacts with electrons in the surrounding non-excited atoms.

If the ejected photoelectron is taken to have a wave-like nature and the surrounding atoms are described as point scatterers, it is possible to imagine the backscattered electron waves interfering with the forward-propagating waves. The resulting interference pattern shows up as a modulation of the measured absorption coefficient, thereby causing the oscillation in the EXAFS spectra. A simplified plane-wave single-scattering theory has been used for interpretation of EXAFS spectra for many years, although modern methods (like FEFF, GNXAS) have shown that curved-wave corrections and multiple-scattering effects can not be neglected. The photelectron scattering amplitude in the low energy range (5-200 eV) of the photoelectron kinetic energy  become much larger so that multiple scattering events become dominant in the XANES  (or NEXAFS) spectra.

The wavelength of the photoelectron is dependent on the energy and phase of the backscattered wave which exists at the central atom. The wavelength changes as a function of the energy of the incoming photon. The phase and amplitude of the backscattered wave are dependent on the type of atom doing the backscattering and the distance of the backscattering atom from the central atom. The dependence of the scattering on atomic species makes it possible to obtain information pertaining to the chemical coordination environment of the original absorbing (centrally excited) atom by analyzing these EXAFS data.

Experimental considerations

Since EXAFS requires a tunable x-ray source, data are frequently collected at synchrotrons, often at beamlines which are especially optimized for the purpose. The utility of a particular synchrotron to study a particular solid depends on the brightness of the x-ray flux at the absorption edges of the relevant elements.

Applications 

XAS is an interdisciplinary technique and its unique properties, as compared to x-ray diffraction, have been exploited for
understanding the details of local structure in:

 glass, amorphous and liquid systems
 solid solutions
 doping and ionic implantation of materials for electronics
 local distortions of crystal lattices
 organometallic compounds
 metalloproteins
 metal clusters
 vibrational dynamics
 ions in solutions
 speciation of elements
XAS provides complementary to diffraction information on peculiarities of local structural and thermal disorder in crystalline and multi-component materials. 

The use of atomistic simulations such as molecular dynamics or the reverse Monte Carlo method can help in extracting more reliable and richer structural information.

Examples
EXAFS is, like XANES, a highly sensitive technique with elemental specificity.  As such, EXAFS is an extremely useful way to determine the chemical state of practically important species which occur in very low abundance or concentration. Frequent use of EXAFS occurs in environmental chemistry, where scientists try to understand the propagation of pollutants through an ecosystem. EXAFS can be used along with accelerator mass spectrometry in forensic examinations, particularly in nuclear non-proliferation applications.

History

A very detailed, balanced and informative account about the history of EXAFS (originally called Kossel's structures) is given by R. Stumm von Bordwehr.
A more modern and accurate account of the history of XAFS (EXAFS and XANES) is given by the leader of the group that developed the modern version of EXAFS in an award lecture by Edward A. Stern.

See also

 X-ray absorption spectroscopy
 X-ray absorption near edge structure
 Surface-extended X-ray absorption fine structure

References

Bibliography

Books

Book chapters

Papers 
 
 
 
 
 F.W. Lytle, "The EXAFS family tree: a personal history of the development of extended X-ray absorption fine structure",
 
 A. Kodre, I. Arčon, Proceedings of 36th International Conference on Microelectronics, Devices and Materials, MIDEM, Postojna, Slovenia, October 28-20, (2000), p. 191-196

External links

International X-ray Absorption Society
FEFF Project, University of Washington, Seattle 
GNXAS project and XAS laboratory, Università di Camerino
EXAFS Spectroscopy Laboratory (Riga, Latvia)
Community web site for XAFS

X-ray absorption spectroscopy